Ñahuimpuquio District (Quechua Ñawinpukyu) is one of sixteen districts of the province Tayacaja in Peru.

See also 
 Inka Mach'ay

References